Ogilvie is a surname of Clan Ogilvie from Angus, Scotland, deriving from the Old Welsh words  ("high") and  ("place").

People with the surname

 Ogilvie baronets
 Adam Ogilvie, Scottish footballer
 Albert Ogilvie (1890–1939), Australian politician, Premier of Tasmania
 Alec Ogilvie (1882–1962), pioneer British aviator
 Alexander Walker Ogilvie, Canadian politician
 Alick Ogilvie, Australian rules footballer who died in WWI
 Andy Ogilvie (born 1965), Canadian lacrosse player
 Bill Ogilvie (1932–2011), Scottish football player and manager
 Dame Bridget Ogilvie (born 1938), Australian scientist
 Campbell Ogilvie, Scottish football administrator (Rangers FC, Heart of Midlothian FC, Scottish Football Association)
 Charles Atmore Ogilvie (1793–1873), English priest
 Charles Ogilvie (disambiguation), several people
 Charles Ogilvie (footballer), Scottish amateur footballer
 Charles Ogilvie (sailor), Jamaican sailor
 Charles Ogilvie (merchant), English merchant and politician
 Charles Atmore Ogilvie, English priest
 David Ogilvie (disambiguation), several people
Dave Ogilvie, Canadian record producer and musician
David Ogilvie (cricketer) (born 1951), former Australian cricketer
 Duncan Ogilvie (1911–1967), Scottish footballer
 Edward Ogilvie (1814–1896), Australian politician 
 Elisabeth Ogilvie (1917–2006), American writer
 Elizabeth Ogilvie (born 1946), Scottish artist
 Francis Grant Ogilvie (c.1858–1930), Scottish scientist and museum curator
 Francis Ogilvie (Governor), Governor of East Florida
 Frederick Ogilvie (1893–1949), Director-General of the BBC
 Fred Ogilvie, American politician, Missouri state representative
 Gary Ogilvie (born 1967), Scottish footballer
 George Ogilvie, 1988 Byron Kennedy Award winner 
 Gordon Ogilvie (1934–2017), New Zealand historian
 James Ogilvie (disambiguation), several people
James Ogilvie (bishop) (died 1518), Scottish bishop
James Nicoll Ogilvie (1860–1926), Scottish minister
James Ogilvie (coach) (died 1950), American football player and coach
James Ogilvie-Grant, 11th Earl of Seafield (1876–1915), Scottish nobleman
 Joe Ogilvie (born 1974), American golfer
 John Ogilvie (disambiguation), several people
John Ogilvie (South African cricketer) (born 1958), South African cricketer
John Ogilvie (Wellington cricketer) (born 1931), New Zealand cricketer
John Ogilvie (Central Districts cricketer) (born 1969), New Zealand cricketer
John Ogilvie (footballer) (1928-2020), Scottish footballer
John Ogilvie (lexicographer) (1797–1867), Scottish lexicographer
John Ogilvie (miller) (1833–1888), Canadian businessman and miller
John Ogilvie (poet) (1733–1813), Scottish reverend and poet
John Ogilvie (saint) (1579–1615), Scottish Jesuit martyr
 Kelvin Ogilvie (born 1942), Canadian chemist and senator
 Lauryn Ogilvie, Australian sport shooter
 Lawrence Ogilvie, plant pathologist in Bermuda and Britain
 Lloyd John Ogilvie (1930–2019), American minister and writer
 Major Ogilvie, American football player
 Malcolm Ogilvie, British ornithologist
 Maria Gordon (née Ogilvie) (1864–1939), Scottish geologist
 Marilyn Bailey Ogilvie, biographer of women scientists
 Nivek Ogre (born 1962), musician, real name Kevin Graham Ogilvie
 Richard B. Ogilvie (1923–1988), 1960s American politician
 Robert Ogilvie (1853–1938), England international footballer
 Robert Maxwell Ogilvie (1932–1981), classical scholar
 Sheilagh Ogilvie (born 1958), Canadian economic historian
 William Ogilvie (disambiguation), several people
William Ogilvie of Pittensear (1736–1819), Scottish land reformer and 'rebel professor'
William Ogilvie (surveyor) (1846–1912), Canadian Commissioner of the Yukon Territory
William Ogilvie (Ardglass) (1740–1832), Scottish scholar and tutor
William Abernethy Ogilvie (1901–1989), Canadian painter and war artist
William Henry Ogilvie (1869–1963), Australian poet, author of Saddle For A Throne
William Robert Ogilvie-Grant (1863–1924), Scottish ornithologist
William Watson Ogilvie (1835–1900), Canadian pioneer

See also
 Ogilvy (name)

References

Scottish surnames